A triple divide or triple watershed is a point on the Earth's surface where three drainage basins meet. A triple divide results from the intersection of two drainage divides. Triple divides range from prominent mountain peaks to minor side peaks, down to simple slope changes on a ridge which are otherwise unremarkable.  The elevation of a triple divide can be thousands of meters to barely above sea level. Triple divides are a common hydrographic feature of any terrain that has rivers, streams and/or lakes.

Topographic triple divides do not necessarily respect the underground path of water. Thus, depending on the infiltration and the different geological layers, the hydrologic triple divide is often offset from the topographic triple divide.

A hydrological apex is a triple divide whose waters flow into three different oceans. Triple Divide Peak in the US State of Montana is the only such place on Earth.

North America

North America has 3 triple divides in the United States which are intersections of continental divides, and a fourth one in British Columbia. Waters at these triple divides flow into three different oceans, seas or gulfs. Triple Divide Peak in Montana is considered the triple divide "hydrological apex" of North America, though Snow Dome on the Alberta-British Columbia border also has a claim depending on how the Arctic and Atlantic oceans are defined.  North America is the only continent that has a triple point dividing basins draining into three different oceans.  Where the Continental Divide splits and joins to form the boundary of the Great Divide Basin, it forms two triple points.

Other points are often considered to be triple divides because they separate basins of continental rivers.
Headwaters Hill in Saguache County, Colorado, near Chester (Arkansas River, Rio Grande River, Colorado River). This point has only a weak claim to being a continental triple divide because both the Rio Grande and Arkansas Rivers flow into the Gulf of Mexico.

The highest elevation significant triple divide in the lower 48 states of the United States, located in Kings Canyon National Park in Fresno/Inyo counties, California, is a sub-peak of Mount Wallace of the central Sierra Nevada:
 Crumbly Spire or Mount Wallace South Peak, Fresno/Inyo counties, California (Tulare Lake via Kings River, Owens Lake via Owens River, Pacific Ocean via San Joaquin River)

Numerous other triple divide points result from intersection of river basin divides, including:
 Young Lick Knob, Georgia (Savannah, Apalachicola, Mississippi)

South America

There are triple points in South America where the divide splits.

Europe

Africa
Water from this point flows to the Atlantic Ocean via the Congo River, to the Mediterranean Sea via the Nile, or to endorheic Lake Chad. At this point meet the second, third and eighth largest drainage basins in the world, making it one of the most important triple divides on earth.

Australia 
Australia has two Continental Drainage Divide Tripoints, both close to each other along Queensland's Great Dividing Range. Both are named after two 1845 exploration party leaders who sought to solve the question of Australia's rivers, Thomas Mitchell and Edmund Kennedy.
 Mitchell Junction is in North Queensland, on Triple C Pastoral Station, near the White Mountains National Park. Water falling on the tripoint can flow either to the Pacific Ocean via the Burdekin River, to the Indian Ocean, via the Flinders River flowing to the Gulf Of Carpentaria and the Indonesian Throughflow and lastly to Lake Eyre via Cooper Creek. approximately 
 Kennedy Junction is in Central Queensland, on Caldervale Station, near Carnarvon National Park. Water falling on the tripoint can flow either to the Pacific Ocean via the Fitzroy River, to the Southern Ocean, via Murray/Darling River and to Lake Eyre via Cooper Creek.

Asia

Asia is dominated by endorheic basins.  There is a point in southern China where the Pacific Ocean, Indian Ocean, and endorheic basins meet and another point in northern China where the Pacific Ocean, endorheic and Arctic Ocean basins meet.

Antarctica

Antarctica is completely circled by the Southern Ocean, and so it has no triple divides.

Older definitions of the oceans did not include the Southern Ocean, and instead had the Atlantic, Pacific and Indian Oceans touch the shores of Antarctica. Based on this outdated definition, Dome Argus is the highest point in the East Antarctic ice sheet and could be considered a triple divide if you assume that the ice forms a watershed.

See also

 Continental divide

References

 

Drainage basins
Hydrology
Drainage divides